Ice is a Polish novel written in 2007 by the Polish science fiction writer Jacek Dukaj, published in Poland by Wydawnictwo Literackie. The novel mixes alternate history with science fiction elements, in particular, with alternative physics and logic. It won the Janusz A. Zajdel Award, European Union Prize for Literature and Kościelski Award.

Translations 
English language rights to Ice have been acquired by London-based publisher Head of Zeus in 2017. The publication date will be announced once the novel is translated. In 2017 the novel was translated to Russian and Bulgarian; in 2018 the novel was translated to Ukrainian.

Universe
The story of the book takes place in an alternate universe where the First World War never occurred and Poland is still under Russian rule. Following the Tunguska event, the Ice, a mysterious form of matter, has covered parts of Siberia in Russia and started expanding outwards, reaching Warsaw. The appearance of Ice results in extreme decrease of temperature, putting the whole continent under constant winter, and is accompanied by Lute, angels of Frost, a strange form of being which seems to be a native inhabitant of Ice. Under the influence of the Ice, iron turns into zimnazo (cold iron), a material with extraordinary physical properties, which results in the creation of a new branch of industry, zimnazo mining and processing, giving birth to large fortunes and new industrial empires. Moreover, the Ice freezes history and philosophy, preserving the old political regime, affecting human psychology and changing the laws of logic from many-valued logic of "Summer" to two-valued logic of "Winter" with no intermediate steps between true and false.

Dukaj noted that in this book, science in science-fiction stands for the philosophy of history. The book's graphic design is by Polish illustrator and producer Tomasz Bagiński.

Plot
The protagonist of the novel is Benedykt Gierosławski, a Polish mathematician and notorious gambler, collaborating with Alfred Tarski on his work on many-valued logics. The Ministry of Winter's officials visit Gierosławski and make him embark on a Transsiberian journey to find his lost father, who is said to be able to communicate with Lute. During his journey Gieroslawski finds out that he is caught in a political intrigue, brought about by rivalry between two palace factions, liedniacy (conservatives and Siberian entrepreneurs backing the idea of "frozen Russia") and ottiepelnicy (mostly revolutionaries aiming for a literal and political "thaw"), supported also by the Tsar. He also meets Nikola Tesla in disguise, who has conceived a technology for manipulating and eventually destroying the Ice and has been hired by the Tsar to relieve Russia from the Winter. During the journey and upon his arrival in Irkutsk Gierosławski discovers that various political forces, including Followers of St. Marcyn, a sect worshiping the Ice led by Rasputin, followers of Nikolai Fyodorovich Fyodorov, who strive for assuring human immortality, and Siberian industrial potentates, are interested in his person and that Józef Piłsudski, in this reality leading a group of Sybiraks and Siberian separatists fighting for Polish independence, may possess knowledge about his father.

Critical reception
Lód was planned as a short story for Król bólu anthology, but has grown into an epic-length novel. The book, counting over 1,000 pages, was published in early December 2007 (samples were released in October issue of Nowa Fantastyka). It had been long-awaited by fans, as Dukaj's previous book – Perfect Imperfection – was published in 2004. Around the time of book's premier, Dukaj was interviewed by Polish radio stations Radio Kraków and by TOK FM. In December 2007, the book received the honorary prize at the Poznań Review of New Publications and was named "Book of Autumn 2007" organized by Raczyński Library in Poznań.

In his review Wojciech Orliński writes that unlike many previous books by Dukaj, this one has excellent action, and names it a "sensational novel par excellence", and compares it to books by Ludlum (albeit in the science-fiction, alternate history genre).

Notes

References
 Lód on official pages of Jacek Dukaj
 News section on official pages of Jacek Dukaj

External links
 English Excerpts from the novel Ice
 First four chapters free for download as a sample
 Jakub Demiańczyk Interview with Jacek Dukaj and discussion of "Lód", Dziennik.pl, 21 December 2007
 Chat with Jacek Dukaj on "Lód", Wirtualna Polska, 6 December 2007
 Wojciech Orliński, Dukaj, Jacek: Lód (review), Gazeta Wyborcza, 3 December 2007

Polish alternate history novels
Polish science fiction novels
Dystopian novels
2007 science fiction novels
Wydawnictwo Literackie books
Jacek Dukaj
Head of Zeus books